Agrochola decipiens is a moth in the family Noctuidae. It is found in North America.

Agrochola
Moths of North America
Moths described in 1881